The Evangelical and Reformed Church in Honduras is a Reformed denomination established in the first half of the 20th century in the country of Honduras, that holds to the Presbyterian church government.

History 
This church was founded by the Evangelical and Reformed Church in the United States. On July 8, 1917 Ramon Guzman Montes in Washington, D.C. showed up the Evangelical Synod of North America to  request to send missionaries to Honduras.
Important footnotes:
On May 1. 1921 was the first evangelistic service
On Monday 29 held the first Sunday school
First baptism in January 1925
First Evangelical and Presbyterian Church was organised in August 1926 with 25 members
In 1934 the Evangelical and Reformed Church in Honduras was represented in the union of the Reformed Church and the Evangelical Synod in Sion Church, Cleveland.

Doctrine 
Apostles Creed
Heidelberg Catechism

Demographics 
The church has 53 congregations in Honduras.

Seminary 
The denomination maintains the Evangelical and Reformed Theological Seminary in San Pedro Sula.

References

External links 
 
 First Evangelical and Reformed Church

Reformed denominations in Central America
Churches in Honduras
Christian organizations established in 1917
Evangelical denominations in North America
1917 establishments in Honduras
1917 in Christianity